The IPSC Finnish Tournament Championship is an IPSC level 3 Tournament championship held once a year by the Finnish Shooting Sport Federation.

Champions 
The following is a list of current and previous champions.

Overall category

See also 
IPSC Finnish Handgun Championship
IPSC Finnish Rifle Championship
IPSC Finnish Shotgun Championship

References 

Match Results - 2007 IPSC Finnish Tournament Championship
Match Results - 2010 IPSC Finnish Tournament Championship
Match Results - 2011 IPSC Finnish Tournament Championship
Match Results - 2012 IPSC Finnish Tournament Championship
Match Results - 2014 IPSC Finnish Tournament Championship

IPSC shooting competitions
National shooting championships
Finland sport-related lists
Shooting competitions in Finland